Barkauer See is a lake in Süsel, Kreis Ostholstein, Schleswig-Holstein, Germany.

Lakes of Schleswig-Holstein
LBarkauerSee